Beneil Khobier Dariush (born May 6, 1989) is an American professional mixed martial artist. He currently competes in the Lightweight division in the Ultimate Fighting Championship (UFC). As of October 24, 2022, he is #4 in the UFC lightweight rankings.

Background
Dariush was born and raised on a farm in Iran. He is a Christian of ethnic Assyrian descent. When he was nine, he and his parents left Iran emigrating to America where they already had several relatives from their large extended family. At the time, Beneil and his sister Beraeil did not speak English, so they spent most of the time playing with their cousins.

Dariush is a devout Christian, often making note of his religious affiliation during UFC media events, promotional work, and post-fight interviews. In keeping with this faith, he sponsors an orphanage and Christian school in Haiti known as the Cap-Haïtien Children's Home.

Dariush is married and has one daughter.

Mixed martial arts career

Early career
Dariush began training Brazilian jiu-jitsu in 2007, earning his black belt in just five years. He was a highly decorated competitor, becoming a no gi world champion as a blue, purple, and brown belt.

Ultimate Fighting Championship
In January 2014, Dariush made his UFC debut on January 15, 2014, at UFC Fight Night 35.  He was scheduled to face Jason High. However, High was forced out of the bout with appendicitis and was replaced by returning veteran Charlie Brenneman. Dariush won the fight via submission in the first round.

Dariush returned three months later, losing to Ramsey Nijem by first-round TKO on April 11, 2014, at UFC Fight Night 39.

Dariush was expected to face Anthony Rocco Martin on August 2, 2014, at UFC 176. After the event was cancelled, the bout was rescheduled for August 23 at UFC Fight Night 49. Dariush won via submission in the second round.

Dariush made his PPV debut at UFC 179 on October 25, 2014, defeating the undefeated Carlos Diego Ferreira by unanimous decision.

Dariush submitted Daron Cruickshank in the second round on March 14, 2015, at UFC 185, winning his first Performance of the Night bonus award.  The bout took place at a catchweight of 157 lbs. as Cruickshank was unable to make the lightweight limit.

Dariush replaced an injured Paul Felder and decisioned Jim Miller on April 18, 2015, at UFC on Fox 15.

Dariush next faced Michael Johnson on August 8, 2015, at UFC Fight Night 73. Dariush won the fight via controversial split decision. Every mainstream MMA media outlet scored the fight as a decision victory for Johnson.

Dariush was expected to face Mairbek Taisumov on January 17, 2016, at UFC Fight Night 81. However, Dariush pulled out of the fight in early December citing injury and was replaced by Chris Wade.

Dariush faced Michael Chiesa on April 16, 2016, at UFC on Fox 19. Dariush lost the fight via submission in the second round.

Dariush next faced James Vick on June 4, 2016, at UFC 199, replacing an injured Evan Dunham. Dariush won the fight via KO in the first round.

Dariush faced Rashid Magomedov on November 5, 2016, at The Ultimate Fighter Latin America 3 Finale. He won the fight via unanimous decision.

Dariush faced Edson Barboza on March 11, 2017, at UFC Fight Night 106. He lost the fight via KO due to a flying knee in the second round.

Dariush fought Evan Dunham on October 7, 2017, at UFC 216. The fight ended in a majority draw, with one judge scoring the bout for Dariush.

Dariush was expected to face Bobby Green on March 3, 2018, at UFC 222. However, on February 14, 2018, it was announced that Green was forced to pull out from the event, citing injury. Green was replaced by Alexander Hernandez. Dariush lost the fight via knockout in the first round.

Dariush was expected to face Chris Gruetzemacher on November 10, 2018, at UFC Fight Night 139. However, on October 18, 2018, it was reported that Gruetzemacher withdrew from the event and he was replaced by newcomer Thiago Moisés. He won the fight via unanimous decision.

Dariush faced Drew Dober on March 9, 2019, at UFC Fight Night 146. He won the fight via submission in the second round. This win earned him the Performance of the Night award.

Dariush was expected to face Drakkar Klose on July 13, 2019, at UFC Fight Night 155. However, on July 7, Dariush pulled out of the fight with an injury. As a result, UFC officials opted to remove Klose from the card and he is expected to be scheduled for a future event instead.

Dariush faced Frank Camacho on October 26, 2019, at UFC on ESPN+ 20. He won the fight via submission in round one. This win earned him the Performance of the Night award.

Dariush next faced Drakkar Klose on March 7, 2020, at UFC 248, a rescheduling of the bout that was canceled in July 2019. He won the fight via knockout in the second round. This win earned him his fourth Performance of the Night award.

Dariush faced Scott Holtzman on August 8, 2020, at UFC Fight Night 174. He won the fight via knockout in round one.

Dariush was scheduled to meet Charles Oliveira on October 4, 2020 at UFC on ESPN: Holm vs. Aldana. However, Oliveira pulled out of the fight in early September for undisclosed reasons. Dariush was removed from the card and was eventually rescheduled for a rematch with Carlos Diego Ferreira at UFC Fight Night 184 on February 6, 2021.

A rematch with Carlos Diego Ferreira took place on February 6, 2021, at UFC Fight Night 184. He won the fight via split decision. This fight earned him the Fight of the Night award.

Dariush faced Tony Ferguson on May 15, 2021, at UFC 262. He won the fight via unanimous decision.

Dariush was scheduled to face Islam Makhachev on February 26, 2022 at UFC Fight Night 202. However, on February 12, it was reported that Dariush withdrew from the event due to an ankle injury.

Dariush faced Mateusz Gamrot on October 22, 2022 at UFC 280. He won the bout by unanimous decision.

Dariush is scheduled to face Charles Oliveira on May 6, 2023, at UFC 288.

Championships and accomplishments

Mixed martial arts
Ultimate Fighting Championship
Performance of the Night (Four times) 
Fight of the Night (One time)  
Tied (Gleison Tibau) for third most wins in UFC Lightweight division history (16)
2020 UFC Honors Comeback of the Year vs. Drakkar Klose
MMAJunkie.com
2020 March Knockout of the Month vs. Drakkar Klose
2020 August Knockout of the Month vs. Scott Holtzman
Respect in the Cage
RITC Lightweight Championship (One time)
One successful title defense

Brazilian jiu-jitsu
Brazilian jiu-jitsu
World No Gi Champion (2010 brown, 2009 purple absolute, 2008 blue)
World No Gi Championship (2010 brown absolute)
Pan American Championship (2009 blue)
World Championship 2nd Place (2012 brown, 2010 purple, 2009 blue)
Pan American Championship 2nd Place (2010 brown weight & absolute)
World Championship 3rd Place (2009 blue absolute)
World No Gi Championship 3rd Place (2009 purple)
Pan American Championship 3rd Place (2011 brown)

Mixed martial arts record

|-
|Win
|align=center|22–4–1
|Mateusz Gamrot
|Decision (unanimous)
|UFC 280
|
|align=center|3
|align=center|5:00
|Abu Dhabi, United Arab Emirates
|
|-
|Win
|align=center|21–4–1
|Tony Ferguson
|Decision (unanimous)
|UFC 262
|
|align=center|3
|align=center|5:00
|Houston, Texas, United States
|
|-
|Win
|align=center|20–4–1
|Carlos Diego Ferreira
|Decision (split)
|UFC Fight Night: Overeem vs. Volkov
|
|align=center|3
|align=center|5:00
|Las Vegas, Nevada, United States
|
|-
|Win
|align=center|19–4–1
|Scott Holtzman
|KO (spinning back fist)
|UFC Fight Night: Lewis vs. Oleinik
|
|align=center|1
|align=center|4:38
|Las Vegas, Nevada, United States
|
|-
|Win
|align=center|18–4–1
|Drakkar Klose
|KO (punch)
|UFC 248
|
|align=center|2
|align=center|1:00
|Las Vegas, Nevada, United States
| 
|-
|Win
|align=center|17–4–1
|Frank Camacho
|Submission (rear-naked choke)
|UFC Fight Night: Maia vs. Askren 
|
|align=center|1
|align=center|2:02
|Kallang, Singapore
|
|-
|Win
|align=center|16–4–1
|Drew Dober
|Submission (triangle armbar)
|UFC Fight Night: Lewis vs. dos Santos
|
|align=center|2
|align=center|4:41
|Wichita, Kansas, United States
|
|-
|Win
|align=center|15–4–1
|Thiago Moisés
|Decision (unanimous)
|UFC Fight Night: The Korean Zombie vs. Rodríguez 
|
|align=center|3
|align=center|5:00
|Denver, Colorado, United States
|
|-
|Loss
|align=center|14–4–1
|Alexander Hernandez
|KO (punch)
|UFC 222 
|
|align=center|1
|align=center|0:42
|Las Vegas, Nevada, United States
|
|-
|Draw
|align=center|
|Evan Dunham
|Draw (majority)
|UFC 216 
|
|align=center|3
|align=center|5:00
|Las Vegas, Nevada, United States
|
|-
|Loss
|align=center|14–3
|Edson Barboza
|KO (flying knee)
|UFC Fight Night: Belfort vs. Gastelum
|
|align=center|2
|align=center|3:35
|Fortaleza, Brazil
|
|-
|Win
|align=center|14–2
|Rashid Magomedov
|Decision (unanimous)
|The Ultimate Fighter Latin America 3 Finale: dos Anjos vs. Ferguson
|
|align=center|3
|align=center|5:00
|Mexico City, Mexico
|
|-
|Win
|align=center|13–2
|James Vick
|KO (punches)
|UFC 199
|
|align=center|1
|align=center|4:16
|Inglewood, California, United States
|
|-
|Loss
|align=center|12–2
|Michael Chiesa
| Submission (neck crank)
|UFC on Fox: Teixeira vs. Evans
|
|align=center|2
|align=center|1:20
|Tampa, Florida, United States
|
|-
|Win
|align=center|12–1
|Michael Johnson
|Decision (split)
|UFC Fight Night: Teixeira vs. Saint Preux
|
|align=center|3
|align=center|5:00
|Nashville, Tennessee, United States
|
|-
|Win
|align=center|11–1
|Jim Miller
|Decision (unanimous)
|UFC on Fox: Machida vs. Rockhold 
|
|align=center|3
|align=center|5:00
|Newark, New Jersey, United States
|
|-
|Win
|align=center|10–1
|Daron Cruickshank
|Submission (rear-naked choke)
|UFC 185
|
|align=center|2
|align=center|2:48
|Dallas, Texas, United States
|
|-
|Win
|align=center|9–1
|Carlos Diego Ferreira
|Decision (unanimous)
|UFC 179
|
|align=center|3
|align=center|5:00
|Rio de Janeiro, Brazil
|
|-
|Win
|align=center|8–1
|Anthony Rocco Martin
|Submission (arm-triangle choke)
|UFC Fight Night: Henderson vs. dos Anjos
|
|align=center|2
|align=center|3:38
|Tulsa, Oklahoma, United States
|
|-
|Loss
|align=center|7–1
|Ramsey Nijem
|TKO (punches)
|UFC Fight Night: Nogueira vs. Nelson
|
|align=center|1
|align=center|4:20
|Abu Dhabi, United Arab Emirates
|
|-
|Win
|align=center|7–0
|Charlie Brenneman
|Submission (rear-naked choke)
|UFC Fight Night: Rockhold vs. Philippou
|
|align=center| 1
|align=center| 1:45
|Duluth, Georgia, United States
| 
|-
|Win
|align=center|6–0
|Jason Meaders
|KO (punch)
|Respect in the Cage
|
|align=center|2
|align=center|4:03
|Pomona, California, United States
|
|-
|Win
|align=center|5–0
|Trace Gray
|Submission (armbar)
|Respect in the Cage
|
|align=center|1
|align=center|0:36
|Pomona, California, United States
|
|-
|Win
|align=center| 4–0
|Gilberto dos Santos
|TKO (doctor stoppage)
|High Fight Rock 2
|
|align=center|1
|align=center|4:03
|Goiânia, Brazil
|
|-
|Win
|align=center|3–0
|Dominic Gutierrez
|Submission (rear-naked choke)
|Samurai Pro Sports 
|
|align=center|1
|align=center|1:16
|Culver City, California, United States
|
|-
|Win
|align=center|2–0
|Vance Bejarano
|Submission (rear-naked choke)
|Respect in the Cage
|
|align=center|1
|align=center|N/A
|Pomona, California, United States
|
|-
|Win
|align=center| 1–0
|Jordan Betts
|Decision (split)
|Respect in the Cage 2
|
|align=center|3
|align=center|5:00
|Pomona, California, United States
|

Grappling record 
{| class="wikitable sortable" style="font-size:80%; text-align:left;"
|-
| colspan=9 style="text-align:center;" | 1 Matches, 0 Wins, 1 Losses
|-
!  Result
!  Rec.
!  Opponent
!  Method
!  text-center|  Event
!  Division
!  Type
!  Date
!  Location
|-
|Loss|| style="text-align:center;"|0-1||  Kron Gracie|| Referee Decision || rowspan=2|ACBJJ World Trials || rowspan=2|-77kg|| rowspan=2|Gi|| rowspan=2| || rowspan=2| San Diego, CA
|

See also
 List of current UFC fighters
 List of male mixed martial artists

References

External links

Official UFC Profile

1989 births
Living people
People from Hamadan Province
American male mixed martial artists
Iranian male mixed martial artists
American people of Iranian-Assyrian descent
Iranian emigrants to the United States
People from Yorba Linda, California
Iranian Assyrian people
Assyrian sportspeople
Sportspeople of Iranian descent
Lightweight mixed martial artists
Mixed martial artists utilizing Muay Thai
Mixed martial artists utilizing Brazilian jiu-jitsu
American Muay Thai practitioners
American practitioners of Brazilian jiu-jitsu
Iranian practitioners of Brazilian jiu-jitsu
People awarded a black belt in Brazilian jiu-jitsu
Ultimate Fighting Championship male fighters
Iranian Christians
American Christians